Venetian Isles is a neighborhood of New Orleans, Louisiana. It is located on the western shore of the Chef Menteur Pass on the northern side of U.S. Highway 90.

Legally a part of the city, Venetian Isles is separated from the bulk of the developed portion of the city by miles of undeveloped land. It long had the appearance of a small fishing town.  In the late 20th century it saw development as a suburban style bedroom community.

The ruins of old Fort Macomb are along Chef Menteur Pass at the south of the neighborhood.

Venetian Isles was hit hard by storm surge during Hurricane Katrina in 2005. As it lies outside of the City's levee system, it experienced damage similar to that seen in Pearlington, Mississippi and Pass Christian.

Former  2nd District Congressman Joseph Cao makes his home in Venetian Isles.

References

Neighborhoods in New Orleans